Edmundo Novillo Aguilar (born 28 January 1963 in Totora, Campero Province, Cochabamba) is a Bolivian lawyer, politician, and Governor of Cochabamba. His political career includes serving on the Departmental Council, as Mayor of Totora, and as a Deputy in the Bolivian Chamber of Deputies. He was Presidents of the Chamber of Deputies for four years from 2006 to 2010. He is affiliated with the Movement for Socialism (MAS-IPSP), and was the first MAS-IPSP member to serve a President of the Chamber of Deputies.

Novillo won the 2010 gubernatorial election in Cochabamba with 61.9% of the vote. He was succeeded in 2015 by Iván Canelas. On 9 November 2020, the recently inaugurated President Luis Arce appointed him Minister of Defense. It was announced on 28 December that Novillo had gone into quarantine after contracting COVID-19.

References

1963 births
Living people
21st-century Bolivian lawyers
21st-century Bolivian politicians
20th-century Bolivian lawyers
Defense ministers of Bolivia
Governors of departments of Bolivia
Luis Arce administration cabinet members
Members of the Chamber of Deputies (Bolivia)
Movement for Socialism (Bolivia) politicians
Presidents of the Chamber of Deputies (Bolivia)
People from Carrasco Province